In mathematics, the Manin–Drinfeld theorem, proved by  and , states that the difference of two cusps of a modular curve has finite order in the Jacobian variety.

References

Modular forms
Theorems in number theory